Wiseana is a genus of moths, collectively known as porina, of the family Hepialidae. There are seven described species, all endemic to New Zealand. Some species of this genus are a major pest in New Zealand exotic pastures. It is impossible to distinguish species at the larval/caterpillar stage without DNA technology, however adult purina moth species can be visually distinguished.

Species
 Wiseana cervinata
Recorded food plants: Trifolium, various grasses.
 Wiseana copularis
 Wiseana fuliginea
 Wiseana jocosa
Larva feeds on grasses
 Wiseana mimica
 Wiseana signata
Larva feeds on grasses
 Wiseana umbraculata
Larva feeds on grasses

References

External links 
 Hepialidae genera

Hepialidae
Moths of New Zealand
Exoporia genera
Taxa named by Pierre Viette